The 1999 World Allround Speed Skating Championships was held on 6–7 February 1999 in the Vikingskipet arena in Hamar, Norway. 

It was the first tournament with 24 participants. 

Title defenders were the 1998 world champions Gunda Niemann-Stirnemann from Germany and Ids Postma from the Netherlands.

Gunda Niemann-Stirnemann from Germany and Rintje Ritsma from the Netherlands became world champions.

Men's championships

Allround results 

NQ = Not qualified for the 10000 m (only the best 12 are qualified)DQ = disqualified
bold signifies championship record.

Women's championships

Allround results 

NQ = Not qualified for the 5000 m (only the best 12 are qualified)DQ = disqualified
bold signifies championship record.

Rules 
All 24 participating skaters are allowed to skate the first three distances; 12 skaters may take part on the fourth distance. These 12 skaters are determined by taking the standings on the longest of the first three distances, as well as the samalog standings after three distances, and comparing these lists as follows:

 Skaters among the top 12 on both lists are qualified.
 To make up a total of 12, skaters are then added in order of their best rank on either list. Samalog standings take precedence over the longest-distance standings in the event of a tie.

References
Results on SpeedSkatingNews

1999 World Allround
World Allround Speed Skating Championships, 1999
World Allround, 1999
Sport in Hamar